Cyathermia naticoides is a species of sea snail, a marine gastropod mollusk in the family Neomphalidae.

Description
The length of the shell attains 6.6 mm.

Distribution
This marine species was found on the East Pacific Rise.

References

 Warén A. & Bouchet P., 1989. New gastropods from East Pacific hydrothermal vents. Zoologica Scripta 18(1): 67-102

External links

Neomphalidae
Gastropods described in 1989